Tyree Cooper, known as simply Tyree, is an American house producer from Chicago, Illinois, United States. He is best known for the hip house track "Turn Up the Bass", which peaked at No. 12 on the UK Singles Chart in 1989.

Biography 
Tyree Cooper originally left high school in 1983 with a basketball scholarship, however decided to enter into producing house music having also DJ'd. His first release was "I Fear the Night" in 1986 on the DJ International Records record label. In 1987, Tyree released what would become a classic of the acid house scene in "Acid Over".

In 1988, Tyree with rapper Kool Rock Steady released the hip house hit "Turn Up The Bass".

Tyree now lives in Berlin.

Discography

Albums 
 Tyree's Got a Brand New House (DJ International Records, 1988)
 Nation of Hip House (CBS, 1989)
 The Time Iz Now! (DJ International, 1991)

Singles/EPs 
 "I Fear the Night" (Underground, 1986)
 "The Whop" with Fast Eddie (Underground, 1987)
 "Acid Over" (Underground, 1987)
 "Turn Up the Bass" featuring Kool Rock Steady (DJ International Records, 1988)
 "Hardcore Hip House" (DJ International, 1989)
 "Let the Music Take Control" (Indisc, 1989)
 "Move Your Body" featuring J.M.D. (DJ International, 1989)
 "Lonely (No More)" (DJ International, 1990)
 "Rock the Discotech" (DJ International, 1991)
 "Da Butt" (Underground, 1995)
 Smoke 2 Dis E.P. (Dance Mania, 1995)
 "Future Recooped" (Dance Mania, 1997)
 "Say Your Prayer" with Sebastian Krieg (Brickhouse Records, 2001)
 "Green Peppermint Sticks" with Dreye (Sandy Records, 2002)
 Vibration E.P. with Stashrider (Frisbee Tracks, 2004)
 "Wonderland" with Denis Naidanow (Sure Player, 2008)
 "Happy People" with Movi-Starr (Groove Baby Records, 2008)
 "Lost" 2008 with Marc Romboy (Ovum Recordings, 2008)
 "I.C.U." (as ZlemTree) (Supa Dupa Records, 2008)

See also
Hip House
List of artists who reached number one on the US Dance chart

References

External links 

Archived Tyree Cooper website

African-American musicians
American house musicians
Acid house musicians
Hip house musicians
Musicians from Chicago
DJs from Chicago
1969 births
Living people
21st-century African-American people
20th-century African-American people